The Canadian territory of Nunavut, which was established in 1999 from the Northwest Territories by the 1993 Nunavut Land Claims Agreement, is divided into three regions. Though these regions have no governments of their own, Nunavut's territorial government services are highly decentralized on a regional basis.. 

In addition, these regions serve as census divisions for Statistics Canada (though the Qikiqtaaluk and Kivalliq regions are known as the "Baffin Region" and the "Keewatin Region" to the agency).

It is a misconception that Nunavut's regions constitute the former regions of the Northwest Territories (NWT), separated in their entirety. This is not the case, rather, the portions of the regions of the Northwest Territories that ended up in the newly created territory were retained and had their borders slightly adjusted upon the creation of Nunavut.

The regional divisions are distinct from the district system of dividing the Northwest Territories that dated to 1876 and was abolished when Nunavut was created, although for practical purposes had not been used since the 1980s. Nunavut encompasses the entirety of the District of Keewatin (which had differing boundaries from the Keewatin/Kivalliq regions), the majority of the District of Franklin and a small portion of the District of Mackenzie.

List

References

 
Regions